The Association of Boxing Alliances in the Philippines (formerly Amateur Boxing Association of the Philippines until 2013), or ABAP, is the governing body for amateur boxing in the Philippines.

History

On May 30, 2013, ABAP held its first general assembly and organizational elections at the Quezon City Sports Club. ABAP also renamed itself and became the "Association of Boxing Alliances in the Philippines". The name change was mandated by the International Boxing Association, which dropped the word "amateur" in all organizations under its aegis.

On August 9, 2016, ABAP President Victorio Vargas, who served as the head of the boxing NSA for 8 years, announced that he will step down from his position and called for an immediate election of the new set of officers, following the dismal performance of two boxers, Charly Suarez and Rogen Ladon in the boxing competitions of the 2016 Summer Olympics. However, it did not materialized. On March 4, 2017, Vargas and Manny Pangilinan were re-elected in their respective positions as President and Chairman of ABAP in their elections.

See also
Philippines national amateur boxing athletes

References

External links

Amateur Boxing Association of the Philippines profile at the Philippine Olympic Committee website
Philippines Sports and Entertainment Portal

Philippines
Boxing in the Philippines
Boxing
Amateur boxing organizations